Edgar Alonso Henríquez (born 16 March 1964) is a former Salvadoran professional football midfielder and currentlythe manager of El Salvador U-21 team.

Club career
Nicknamed Kiko, Henríquez started his career at Tercera División club Adler San Nicolás, then moved up a division with Salvadoreño de Armenia and made his debut in the Primera División de Fútbol de El Salvador with UES in 1985.

He also played for the country's top flight clubs Chalatenango, Luis Ángel Firpo, with whom he won four league titles, El Roble and Alianza, with whom he won one more championship.

He retired from playing in 1997.

International career
Henríquez made his debut for El Salvador in 1986 and has represented his country in 1 FIFA World Cup qualification match.

His final international game was a May 1994 Miami Cup match against Colombia.

Coaching career
He coached various clubs of the Primera División de Fútbol de El Salvador, including UES, Luis Ángel Firpo and Santa Tecla, with varying degree of success.

Nejapa
In 2009, he was assistant of Nejapa.

Vendaval
In 2009, Henríquez signed as coach of Vendaval. He left the team in 2010.

UES
Henríquez signed as new coach of UES in November 2010. His balance with UES was two wins, six draws and four losses, after being replaced by Brazilian manager Eraldo Correia in March 2011.

Topiltzín
In 2011, he signed as new coach of Topiltzín, replacing Miguel Aguilar Obando.

Alianza reserves
In June 2011, Henríquez signed as new coach of the Alianza reserves, after moving in from Segunda División club Topiltzín.

Santa Tecla
In December 2011, he signed as new coach of Santa Tecla, replacing Rubén Alonso. Henríqued led the team to won the Clausura 2012 final of Segunda División and the promotion to the Primera División. He left the team in June 2012, being replaced by Osvaldo Escudero.

Luis Ángel Firpo
In 2012, he signed as new coach of Luis Ángel Firpo, replacing Nelson Mauricio Ancheta. Henríquez left the team in March 2013, being replaced by Roberto Gamarra.

Return to Santa Tecla
Henríquez signed again as new coach of Santa Tecla for the Apertura 2013 tournament, replacing William Renderos Iraheta. Santa Tecla finished in eighth position at the end of the tournament.

Henríquez left the team in May 2014 in mutual agreement with the club, being replaced by Osvaldo Escudero.

El Salvador under-17
In April 2015, Henríquez was hired to become the head coach of the El Salvador (Under 17) and Under 15 national football team. In December 2015, Henríquez resigned, being replaced by Erick Dowson Prado.

Marte Soyapango
In 2014, Henríquez signed as coach of Marte Soyapango.

Return to UES
Henríquez signed as new coach of UES again in the Clausura 2016 tournament, replacing Efraín Burgos. Henríquez had the mission to save the scarlet team from the descent. His first official match in his return was a 0–3 defeat against Alianza in the Estadio Cuscatlán.

The team was immersed in an economic and sports crisis. Despite an initial streak of matches without winning (5 games), UES defeated Atlético Marte 1–0 in the Estadio Jorge "Mágico" González and began to add points that in the end were crucial to save the descent.

Henríquez started coaching the team in the Apertura 2016 tournament. His first match was 1–2 defeat against FAS in the Estadio Universitario. Then the team suffered a streak of matches without winning (11 games) and after a 1–3 against FAS in the Estadio Cuscatlán he left the team, being replaced by Efraín Burgos.

Henríquez coaching the team in 37 games.

Independiente FC
In August 2017, Henríquez signed as new coach of Independiente FC, replacing Rubén Alonso. His goal was to promote the team of San Vicente to the Primera División. However, he remained on the team until December of the same year.

Return to Vendaval
In 2018, Henríquez signed as new coach of Vendaval, again.

Honours
Primera División de Fútbol de El Salvador: 5
 1989, 1991, 1992, 1993, 1996

References

1964 births
Living people
Sportspeople from San Salvador
Association football forwards
Salvadoran footballers
El Salvador international footballers
C.D. Chalatenango footballers
C.D. Luis Ángel Firpo footballers
Alianza F.C. footballers
Salvadoran football managers
C.D. Luis Ángel Firpo managers